Albert Alphonso Johnson Jr. is a retired professional American football player who played defensive back and running back for six seasons for the Houston Oilers.

References

1950 births
Living people
American football defensive backs
American football running backs
American football quarterbacks
Houston Oilers players
Cincinnati Bearcats football players